Brian Selby Hartley (16 April 1926 – 3 May 2021) FRS was a British biochemist. He was Professor of Biochemistry at Imperial College London from 1974 to 1991.

Education 
Hartley was educated at Queens' College, Cambridge graduating with a Bachelor of Arts in 1947 followed by a Master of Arts degree in 1952. He moved to the University of Leeds where he was awarded a PhD in 1952 for research supervised by Malcolm Dixon and Bernard A. Kilby.

Career and research 
From 1952 to 1964, Hartley pioneered work on the sequence and mechanism of the enzyme chymotrypsin in Cambridge, and developed the use of paper chromatography to separate amino acids and peptides — an essential part of protein characterisation at that time. In 1965, he became a founding member of the Medical Research Council (MRC) Laboratory of Molecular Biology (LMB), and collaborated with David Mervyn Blow in determining the structure and mechanism of chymotrypsin, as part of extensive work on chymotrypsin and related enzymes.

 His group also showed that mammalian serine proteases, including the blood clotting cascade, had homologous structures and mechanisms, indicating a common evolutionary origin. Hartley also studied other enzymes, such as aminoacyl tRNA synthetases (with Alan Fersht), xylose isomerase and glucose isomerase.

In 1974, Hartley became Head of the Department of Biochemistry at Imperial College London, converting it into a centre for molecular biology. In 1982, he conceived the need for a discipline – biotechnology – to exploit molecular biology breakthroughs. He left the Department of Biochemistry to set up Imperial's Centre for Biotechnology, and became a founding board member of Biogen – the longest surviving genetic engineering company. Since then, Hartley has founded companies to make cheap bioethanol from waste hemicellulosic biomass, using genetically engineered compost heap microorganisms.

Awards and honours 
Hartley was elected a Fellow of the Royal Society (FRS) in 1971. His certificate of election reads:

References 

1926 births
2021 deaths
Fellows of the Royal Society
British biochemists
Academics of Imperial College London
Alumni of Queens' College, Cambridge
Alumni of the University of Leeds
People from Rawtenstall